Gullspångsälven is a river of southwestern Sweden. It flows for 8 kilometres through the province of Västergötland.

References

Rivers of Värmland County
Västergötland
Värmland